Oving is a small village, and civil and ecclesiastical parish in the Chichester District of West Sussex, England. The civil parish includes the settlements of Colworth, Drayton, Merston, and Shopwhyke.

History
Although in the ancient hundred of Boxgrove, Oving is not listed in the Domesday Book of 1086.

In 1894, the portion of Rumboldswyke lying outside the city limits of Chichester was added to Oving parish.

In 1895, the parish of Portfield was added to Oving parish.

The West Sussex Review Order of 1933 incorporated the parish of Merston into Oving, increasing the acreage of Oving to 3,013.

Governance 
Oving is governed by the Oving Parish Council. The chairman of the parish council is Councillor Rod Hague.

Geography
The landscape is flat and is given over mainly to agriculture with some growing of salad crops close to the A259.  The landscape of the western part of the parish at Drayton and Shopwhyke has been affected by gravel extraction, which has left a number of lakes that are inaccessible to the public.

Demography
The parish had a population of 1,022 in the 2001 UK Census, increasing to 1,051 at the 2011 census. Half the population lives in Oving village, the rest in the smaller settlements of Shopwhyke, Drayton, Merston and Colworth.

Amenities
Oving village is known for the Gribble Inn, a popular country pub with a real ale brewery attached. This is the origin of the ale, Fursty Ferret, now owned by Hall and Woodhouse. The other prominent public building is St Andrew's parish church, which dates from the 13th century.

References

External links

A short history of Oving Parish

Villages in West Sussex
Chichester District